The West Indies national cricket team visited India in 2002 for a 3-match test series and followed by 7 one day international matches. India won the test series 2-0 and  West Indies won the ODI series 4-3.

Squads

Test Series

1st Test

2nd Test

3rd Test

ODI Series

1st ODI

2nd ODI

3rd ODI

4th ODI

5th ODI

6th ODI

7th ODI

Statistics

Tests

Batting
Most runs

Bowling
Most wickets

ODIs

Batting
Most runs

Bowling
Most wickets

References

International cricket competitions in 2002–03
2002 in Indian cricket
2002 in West Indian cricket
West Indian cricket tours of India
Indian cricket seasons from 2000–01